The 1998 Michigan Secretary of State election was held on November 3, 1998. Incumbent Republican Candice Miller defeated Democratic nominee Mary Lou Parks with 67.68% of the vote.

To date, this is the most recent statewide election in which Wayne County voted for the Republican candidate.

General election

Candidates
Major party candidates
Candice Miller, Republican
Mary Parks, Democratic
Other candidates
Perry Kent Spencer, Reform

Results

References

Secretary of State election
Michigan Secretary of State elections
Michigan
Michigan Secretary of State election